Édouard Lefèvre (22 January 183917 June 1894) was a French botanist and later entomologist who specialised in Coleoptera. He became a member of the Entomological Society of France in 1869, and twice served as president of the society in 1884 and 1893.
 
He was a civil servant.

References

 
Constantin, R. 1992: Memorial des Coléopteristes Français. Bull. liaison Assoc. Col. reg. parisienne, Paris (Suppl. 14)  
Lhoste, J. 1987: Les entomologistes français. 1750 - 1950. INRA (Institut National de la Recherche Agronomique), Paris : 1-355 78-79 
Musgrave, A. 1932: Bibliography of Australian Entomology 1775 - 1930. Sydney

19th-century French botanists
French entomologists
Coleopterists
1839 births
People from Chartres
1894 deaths
Presidents of the Société entomologique de France